Aminobacterium thunnarium is a Gram-negative, anaerobic, mesophilic and non-spore-forming bacterium from the genus of Aminobacterium which has been isolated from sludge.

References

Bacteria described in 2015
Synergistota